Kang Young-joong (born July 27, 1949), the chairman of Daekyo Group, the largest private tutoring company in Korea, served as the President of the Korea Scout Association from March 7, 2008 to April 16, 2012.

Background
Kang served as the Badminton World Federation president from 2005 to 2013. On March 23, 2015, he was inaugurated the fourth President of the Korea Sports Safety Foundation.

In 2011, he was awarded the highest distinction of the Scout Association of Japan, the Golden Pheasant Award.

References

External links

1949 births
Scouting in South Korea
South Korean businesspeople
Konkuk University alumni
People from Jinju
Living people
Badminton executives and administrators